High Kirk, also known as the Old Parish Church, is a Church of Scotland church building in Dunoon, Argyll and Bute, Scotland. It is located on Kirk Street, just south of the town centre. Constructed in the Gothic revival style, it is a Category B listed building.

History
The church was completed in 1816, to a design by architect James Gillespie Graham of Edinburgh, built near the site of an earlier, 15th-century parish church, the Bishop's Palace, which became the Cathedral Church of both the Roman Catholic and Episcopalian Bishops of Argyll. In the late 18th century, this building became dilapidated and was demolished, and the stone used to build the current incarnation. It was enlarged in 1834 by David Hamilton of Glasgow. Five years later, the church's tower, which is in three stages, was raised by eight feet. It has a clock, presented by William Campbell, on each of its four sides. In 1909, Andrew Balfour lengthened and widened the church. The 1939 chancel window is by Douglas Hamilton.

Graveyard
The church's graveyard contains gravestones dating from the 13th century. Also interred here are bishops Andrew Boyd, John Cameron (d. 1623)  and Hector McLean.

See also

List of listed buildings in Dunoon

References

External links
 The High Kirk Dunoon - Google Sites
 Scotland's Churches Trust website
 A 19th-century view of the church

Category B listed buildings in Argyll and Bute
Listed churches in Scotland
Churches in Dunoon
Dunoon
1816 establishments in Scotland
Listed buildings in Dunoon